is a Japanese astronomer and a discoverer of minor planets.

In collaboration with Japanese astronomer Masanori Hirasawa, Suzuki discovered 52 numbered minor planets at Mount Nyukasa Station between 1991 and 1998. Both men are graduates of Waseda University, which they named an asteroid after in 1991.

List of discovered minor planets

References 
 

Discoverers of asteroids

20th-century Japanese astronomers
Living people
Year of birth missing (living people)